Zelyony, feminine: Zelyonaya , meaning "green")  is a Russian surname. It may be transliterated as Zeliony. Russian words often printed without diacritics over ё and may be occasionally transliterated as "Zeleny". Notable people with this surname include:

Lev Zelyony (born 1948), Soviet and Russian physicist
Rina Zelyonaya (1901-1991), Soviet actress
 Vsevolod Zelyony,  native name of Vsevolods Zeļonijs, Latvian judoka

See also
 Zeleny, an equivalent surname in some other Slavic languages
Zelenoy

Russian-language surnames